is a Japanese football player.

Club statistics
Updated to 23 February 2018.

References

External links
Profile at Nara Club
Profile at Tokyo Musashino City FC
Profile at Kagoshima United FC

1993 births
Living people
Nippon Sport Science University alumni
Association football people from Osaka Prefecture
Japanese footballers
J3 League players
Japan Football League players
Kagoshima United FC players
Tokyo Musashino United FC players
Nara Club players
Association football forwards